Early Sunday Morning is a 1930 painting by American artist Edward Hopper.

Description
The painting portrays the small businesses and shops of Seventh Avenue in New York City shortly after sunrise. It shows a cloudless sky over a long, red building. A red and blue striped barber pole sits in front of one of the doorways on the right side of the sidewalk, and a green fire hydrant is on the left. The bleak, empty street and storefronts are said to be a representation of the dire state of the city during the Great Depression.

Despite the title, Hopper has said that the painting was not necessarily based on a Sunday view. The painting was originally titled Seventh Avenue Shops. The addition of "Sunday" to the title was "tacked on by someone else".

The image was based on a building nearby Hopper's studio. It is said to be "almost a literal translation of Seventh Avenue", however a few minor details were changed, like decreasing the size of the doorways and making less clear the letters on the storefront.

Provenance
It is currently in the collection of the Whitney Museum of American Art.

The piece was originally sold to the Whitney for $2,000. It was purchased with funds from Gertrude Vanderbilt Whitney just a few months after it was painted, and would go on to become a part of the Whitney's founding collection.

Critical response
"Early Sunday Morning is a prelude to the wakeful coffee urns and to those who tend them to defeat the night". Karal Ann Marling 

"The painting’s bone-deep conservatism, and its obvious, almost polemical resistance to the most ambitious European art of its day. In the midst of the depression in America, that conservatism is as much a part of the painting’s subject as the closed shops it depicts." Blake Gopnik 

The painting has become the inspiration for other works of art. Examples include Byron Vazakas' poem "Early Sunday Morning"  and John Stone's poem of the same name.

References

External links
Whitney.org

Paintings by Edward Hopper
1930 paintings
Paintings in the collection of the Whitney Museum of American Art